The PBS TJ150 is a Czech turbojet engine produced by PBS Velká Bíteš. The engine was developed for unmanned aerial vehicles, including target drones, as well as manned aircraft. The PBS TJ150 with a thrust up to 1,500N is the most powerful engine in the PBS engine range. The engine entered serial production in 2019.

Design 
The PBS TJ150 is a small single-shaft turbojet engine consisting of a radial compressor, radial and axial diffuser, annular combustion chamber, axial turbine and a fixed outlet nozzle. The engine has a built-in starter-generator to start and supply powerto the deck network, and a separate oil system.

The PBS TJ150 engine was developed from PBS TJ100 engine utilizing the same outer diameter dimensions and engine weight but has 20 % more power. One of the PBS TJ150 engine versions enables landing on salt water.

Specifications

References 

2000s turbojet engines